Julieta Pinto (31 July 1921 – 22 December 2022) was a Costa Rican educator and writer.

Early life and schooling
Pinto was born in San José, Costa Rica, on 31 July 1921, but spent most of her youth on a farm in San Rafael de Alajuela, a time that demonstrated to her the harsh conditions of the working classes and those in lower economic levels. Her secondary schooling was at the Colegio Superior de Señoritas in San José.  She then entered the Universidad de Costa Rica where she obtained a degree in philology.

After her graduation in Costa Rica, Pinto enrolled at the Sorbonne in Paris, where she studied the sociology of literature.

Career
Pinto founded and became the first director of the Escuela de Literatura y Ciencias del Lenguaje (School of Literature and Language Studies) at the Universidad Nacional de Heredia. During that same time she served in several public-service areas (e.g. IMAS, PANI, ITCO, and Editorial Costa Rica), motivated solely by her desire to improve society.

Pinto served as a professor of Hispanic literature at the University of San Ramón.

Personal life and death
Pinto turned 100 in July 2021, and died on 22 December 2022, at the age of 101.

Prizes and awards
Premio Nacional Aquileo J. Echeverría (novela) — 1969
Premio Nacional Aquileo J. Echeverría (cuento) — 1970 and 1994
Premio Nacional de Cultura Magón — 1996

The written works of Pinto tend to be philosophical in nature. Her historical novel Tata Pinto concerns the life of her ancestor Antonio Pinto.

Bibliography
Cuentos de la tierra (1963) — her first publication, a collection of short stories
La estación que sigue al verano (1969) — Premio Aquileo J. Echeverría
Los marginados (1970) — Premio Aquileo J. Echeverría
David (1973) — a children's book
A la vuelta de la esquina (1975)
Si se oyera el silencio (1976)
El sermón de lo cotidiano (1977)
El eco de los pasos (1979)
Abrir los ojos (1982)
La lagartija de la panza color musgo (1986) — a children's book
Entre el sol y la neblina (1986) — a novel for young readers
Historia de Navidad (1988) — a children's book
Tierra de espejismos (1991)
El despertar de Lázaro (1994) — Premio Nacional de Cultura Magón (the fifth female to receive this prize)
El lenguaje de la lluvia (1996) — Premio Aquileo J. Echeverría
El niño que vivía en dos casas (1997)
Tata Pinto (2005)
The Blue Fish
La Vieja Casona (The Old House)
Detrás del Espejo (Behind the Mirror) (2000)
Los Marginados
Costa Rica: A Traveler's Literary Companion (contributor)

References

1921 births
2022 deaths
University of Paris alumni
Costa Rican women short story writers
Costa Rican short story writers
People from San José, Costa Rica
Costa Rican centenarians
Women centenarians
People from Alajuela Province
University of Costa Rica alumni
20th-century Costa Rican women writers
20th-century novelists
Costa Rican novelists
21st-century Costa Rican women writers
21st-century novelists
20th-century short story writers
21st-century short story writers
20th-century Costa Rican writers
21st-century Costa Rican writers
Costa Rican expatriates in France